Giuseppe Albanese (born in Reggio Calabria; 11 May 1979) is an Italian pianist.

Early years 
Albanese studied at Imola International Piano Academy and at Messina University, where he was awarded a Magna cum laude Doctorate in Philosophy, writing his thesis on the aesthetics of Liszt in his Années de pèlerinage. At age of 25, Giuseppe became a full professor, teaching Methodology of Musical Communication at the University of Messina.

Career 
He launched his career winning First Prize at the Vendome International Piano Competition in London, with a distinguished jury chaired by Sir Jeffrey Tate, Stephen Bishop-Kovacevich, Elisabeth Leonskaja, Elisabeth Söderstrom, Christa Ludwig, defined by Le Figaro as “the piano world’s most prestigious award". Albanese was awarded First Prize at Premio Venezia, the most important Italian piano competition.

His concerts are regularly broadcast by RAI Italian national radio and television, and Classical HD recently broadcast his Debussy program performed in Teatro Bibiena in Mantova.

Piano competitions
1997: First Prize at "Premio Venezia" competition (President of the jury: Roman Vlad);
2003: "Special prize for the best piano contemporary execution" at Ferruccio Busoni competition
2003: First Prize at "Vendome Prize" international competition (President of the jury: Jeffrey Tate).

Recordings
In 2018, Universal released his recording of Liszt's Piano Concertos 1 & 2 and Malédiction with the “Russian Philharmonic”.

In 2020 Albanese released his third DG album “Invitation to the dance”, featuring works by Weber, Delibes, Tchaikovsky, Stravinsky, Debussy and Ravel.

Discography
 1998: Premio Venezia: Recital of the "Premio Venezia" winner;
 1999: Luciano Simoni: Europe Piano Concerto Op. 50 for piano and orchestra (Agorà/Delta Dischi);
 2000: 1900: Recital with music by Bartok, Mac Dowell, Szymanowski and Scrjabin (QuadroFrame);
 2004: En plen air: Recital of the "Vendome Prize" winner (produced by Jerusalem Music Center);
 2012: Pour le piano: Monograph on Claude Debussy, Albanese;
 2014: Fantasia, Albanese – (Deutsche Grammophon);
 2015: Liszt – Après une lecture de Liszt, Albanese – (Deutsche Grammophon);
 2016: Bartók’s “Valtozatok” BB 64 in “Bartók complete works” (Decca Classics);
 2017: Liszt Piano Concertos Nos. 1&2 and Malédiction, Albanese (Universal Music Group);
 2020: Invitation to the dance, Albanese – (Deutsche Grammophon);

References

External links 
 Official Web Site
 You Tube – Chopin, Nocturne Op. 62 No.1
 You Tube – Prokofiev, Piano Concerto No.3 – 1st movement
 You Tube – Ciaikovskij, Piano Concerto No.1 – 1st movement
 You Tube – MITO 2011, Liszt – 200 Years Celebration

1979 births
Deutsche Grammophon artists
Living people
Italian classical pianists
Male classical pianists
Italian male pianists
University of Messina alumni
Academic staff of the University of Messina
21st-century classical pianists
21st-century Italian male musicians